Poorhouse Creek is a  4.18-mile-long (6.73 km), second-order tributary to the Cape Fear River in Harnett County, North Carolina. It rises in Lillington, North Carolina, and then flows southeast, curving north to join the Cape Fear River about 0.5 miles east of Lillington, and drains  of area, receives about 46.2 in/year of precipitation, has a wetness index of 538.0, and is about 28% forested.

See also
List of rivers of North Carolina

References

Rivers of North Carolina
Rivers of Harnett County, North Carolina
Tributaries of the Cape Fear River